The Confederation of Cooperative Companies of the Basque Country (Spanish: Confederación de Cooperativas de Euskadi; Basque: Euskadiko Kooperatiben Konfederazioa) is a Basque institution founded in 1996 that represents the social economy business community of the Basque Country.

Its current chairperson is Rosa Lavín.

Organization 

The business organization was created in 1996 and brings together and represents all the sector of Basque social economy businesses (employers' organization).

The organization represents more than a thousand social economy corporations, including: banking entities, credit companies, labor, associated work and others, among them the largest is the Mondragon Corporation.

Chairperson 

 Rosa Lavín (2015-)

See also 

 Confederación Empresarial de Economia Social
 Confederación Española de Organizaciones Empresariales
 Rosa Lavín

References 

Employers' organizations
Business organisations based in Spain